The Roman Catholic Diocese of Mahenge is a diocese located in the city of Mahenge in the Ecclesiastical province of Dar-es-Salaam in Tanzania.

History
 April 21, 1964: Established as Diocese of Mahenge from Metropolitan Archdiocese of Dar-es-Salaam

Bishops
 Bishops of Mahenge (Roman rite)
 Bishop Elias Mchonde (1964.04.21 – 1969.06.13)
 Bishop Nikasius Kipengele (1970.06.25 – 1971.12.07)
 Bishop Patrick Iteka (1973.06.14 – 1993.08.22)
 Bishop Agapiti Ndorobo (since 1995.03.03)

Other priests of this diocese who became bishops
Salutaris Melchior Libena, appointed auxiliary bishop of Dar-es-Salaam in 2010
Filbert Felician Mhasi, appointed Bishop of Tunduru-Masasi in 2018

See also
Roman Catholicism in Tanzania

Sources
 GCatholic.org
 Catholic Hierarchy

Mahenge
Christian organizations established in 1964
Roman Catholic dioceses and prelatures established in the 20th century
Mahenge, Roman Catholic Diocese of
1964 establishments in Tanganyika